The Awrtable Ughazate or the Yusuf Darood Emirate (Somali: Ugaasyada Awrtable or Boqortooyada Yuusuf Daarood) (Arabic: إماراة  الأورتبلي) was an Ughazate that ruled the Bari-Nugaaleed, northern Mudug and southern Bari regions from mid-1300s to the early 1700s, and was fully incorporated into the court of the Majeerteen Sultanate in 1765.

History

Establishment 
The Awrtable clan are a sub-clan of the Darood, who trace their linage back to the Bani Hashim clan of the Prophet Mohamed. The Awrtable Ughazate was founded by the ruling Ugaasid Family of the Musa Ibrahim sub-clan of Awrtable. It was founded by Mohamed bin Faraah, after a dream that his clan would be spread out far and wide and would rule from the city of Ilig (now called Eyl).

References

Former countries in Africa
Medieval Somalia
Early Modern history of Somalia
Former sultanates
States and territories established in the 14th century
States and territories disestablished in the 1760s
14th-century establishments in Africa
1765 disestablishments in Africa
18th century in Somalia